A meeting for worship is what the Religious Society of Friends (or "Quakers") call their church service. Different branches of Friends have different types of meetings for worship. A meeting for worship in English-speaking countries typically lasts an hour.

Unprogrammed worship
Unprogrammed worship is based on silence and inward listening to the Spirit, from which any participant may share a message. In unprogrammed meetings for worship, someone speaks when that person feels that God/Spirit/the universe has given them a message for others. After anyone speaks, several minutes are allowed to pass before anyone else speaks, to allow the message to be considered carefully. Friends (members of the Religious Society of Friends) do not answer or argue about others' messages during meeting for worship. 

Many unprogrammed meetings follow worship with a time for participants to 
share. Some ask for joys and sorrows; others for something a person considered sharing during worship.

Programmed Worship
Pastoral meetings, as the name implies, have a pastor or minister whose job is to preach and provide pastoral care. They have programmed worship which includes many elements similar to Protestant services, such as a sermon and hymns. Many programmed meetings also include a time during the service for silent, expectant waiting and messages from the participants.

Semi-programmed Worship
Some meetings have "semi-programmed" worship which combines elements of programmed worship  along with a long period of unprogrammed worship.

References

Sources 
 What is Quaker Meeting for Worship? (Halifax, Canada Meeting's website)
 BBC Religion website: Quakers: Worship.
 Four Doors to Meeting for Worship by William P. Taber.  See also a summary of William Taber’s Pendle Hill Pamphlet
 Quaker Faith and Practice, Chapter 2 “Approaches to God – worship and prayer” of Britain Yearly Meeting
 Welcome to Friends Meeting for Worship by Virginia Schurmann

Meeting for worship
Silence
Christian worship and liturgy